This was the first edition of the tournament.

Matt Reid and John-Patrick Smith won the title after defeating Gong Maoxin and Zhang Ze 6–7(4–7), 7–5, [10–7] in the final.

Seeds

Draw

References
 Main Draw

Kunal Patel San Francisco Open - Doubles
2017 in San Francisco